Karo Semyonovich Halabyan (26 July 1897, Elisabethpol, now Ganja - 5 January 1959, Moscow) was a Soviet Armenian architect. He earned the title of emeritus art worker of the Armenian SSR (1940).

Biography

Halabyan graduated from Nersisian School in Tiflis in 1917 and from the Moscow School of Painting, Sculpture and Architecture in 1929. After 1932, he worked in Moscow. He led the project to reconstruct Volgograd in 1943.

In 1936, he was elected as an honorary correspondent member of the Royal Institute of British Architects. Halabyan held the prestigious title of chief architect of Moscow.

Between 1932 and 1950 Halabyan served as a secretary of the Union of Architects of the Soviet Union. From 1937 to 1950 he was the deputy of the Supreme Soviet of the union. He was vice president and later president of the USSR Academy of Architecture.

In 1955, he designed the main terminal building of the Port of Sochi (Georgia).

Halabyan died on 5 January, 1959 in Moscow, and was buried at Novodevichy Cemetery.

See also 
Nersisian School

References 

 Կարո Հալաբյան 
 Կարո Հալաբյան 

1897 births
1959 deaths
People from Ganja, Azerbaijan
People from Elizavetpol Governorate
Nersisian School alumni
Soviet Armenians
Russian Social Democratic Labour Party members
Communist Party of the Soviet Union members
Recipients of the Order of the Red Banner of Labour
First convocation members of the Soviet of Nationalities
Second convocation members of the Soviet of Nationalities
Ethnic Armenian architects
Soviet architects
Moscow School of Painting, Sculpture and Architecture alumni